Abacetus dejeani is a species of ground beetle in the subfamily Pterostichinae. It was described by Nietner in 1858.

References

dejeani
Beetles described in 1858